Shiva (also Romanized as Shīvā; also known as Shīū) is a village in Lafmejan Rural District, in the Central District of Lahijan County, Gilan Province, Iran. At the 2006 census, its population was 204, in 68 families.

References 

Populated places in Lahijan County